Richard Radcliffe (died 9 October 1660) was an English politician who sat in the House of Commons  in 1656.

Radcliffe was the son of Richard Radcliffe of Manchester who died in 1645 and was probably descended from the Radcliffes of Ordsall. He was of the Lodge,  Pool Field, Manchester.

In 1656, Radcliffe was elected Member of Parliament for Manchester in the Second Protectorate Parliament. The Manchester constituency had been created in 1654 for the First Protectorate Parliament and was disenfranchised again for the Third Protectorate Parliament.

References

Year of birth missing
1660 deaths
English MPs 1656–1658
Members of the Parliament of England for Manchester